The Scarlet Brotherhood is a regional sourcebook for the Greyhawk campaign setting for the Dungeons & Dragons fantasy role-playing game.

Contents
The Scarlet Brotherhood detailed the Scarlet Brotherhood lands, the Tilvanot Peninsula, Hepmonaland, and the Amedio Jungle.

The sourcebook was notable for being the first source on the Olman people since The Hidden Shrine of Tamoachan and for detailing many new nations and realms south of the Flanaess for the first time. The Touv people and their pantheon were invented for this book. Several new monsters, including the Bredthrall, and many new plants and flora were created for this book as well.

Publication history
The sourcebook was written by Sean K. Reynolds, and published by TSR in 1999 for 2nd edition Advanced Dungeons & Dragons.

Reception

Reviews
Backstab #15

References

Bibliography
 Reynolds, Sean K. The Scarlet Brotherhood. Renton, WA: TSR, 1999.

Greyhawk books
Role-playing game supplements introduced in 1999